Datong University may refer to:

 Shanxi Datong University, in Datong, Shanxi
 Tatung University, Taipei
 Utopia University, or Datong University, Shanghai